The Waikari River is a river of the northern Canterbury region of New Zealand's South Island. The name Waikari comes from the Maori word wai meaning "water" and kari meaning "dig".

See also
List of rivers of New Zealand

References

Rivers of Canterbury, New Zealand
Rivers of New Zealand